Enrique Soro Barriga (July 15, 1884 – 1954) was a Chilean composer. He won the National Prize of Art of Chile in 1948.

Naxos has recorded a disc of his works, comprising the following: Danza Fantástica, 3 Aires chilenos, Andante appassionato (version for orchestra), and Sinfonía romántica.

References

1884 births
1954 deaths
People from Concepción, Chile
Chilean composers